Carlo Antonio Nagli (ca. 1680 – 1756) was an Italian composer of Baroque music who was one of a number of Italian baroque musicians to live temporarily or permanently in Croatia.

Biography
Born at the end of the 17th century in Rimini (the exact year is unknown), Nagli arrived in Dalmatia in 1707 and was active as maestro di cappella at the Split Cathedral, possibly until 1726 and then again from 1738 to 1743. He later moved to Venice where he died in 1756.

Works
Little is known about his life and only very few compositions have been preserved. Among the preserved pieces are two masses and four credos, all located in Paris. Among the compositions is one hymn from 1740 to Saint Domnius, the patron saint of the city of Split, which is kept today in the Split City Museum.

References

1680 births
1756 deaths
Italian Baroque composers
Italian male classical composers
Croatian composers
18th-century Italian composers
18th-century Italian male musicians
Italian expatriates in Croatia